The 2006 Czech Republic motorcycle Grand Prix was the twelfth round of the 2006 MotoGP Championship. It took place on the weekend of 18–20 August 2006 at the Masaryk Circuit located in Brno, Czech Republic.

This was the last European round to feature tobacco sponsorship, because tobacco companies sponsoring MotoGP rounds would be banned from the 2007 season onwards.

MotoGP classification

250cc classification

125cc classification

Championship standings after the race (MotoGP)

Below are the standings for the top five riders and constructors after round twelve has concluded.

Riders' Championship standings

Constructors' Championship standings

 Note: Only the top five positions are included for both sets of standings.

References

Czech Republic motorcycle Grand Prix
Czech Republic
Motorcycle Grand Prix